Colegio Italiano Antonio Raimondi is a private Italian international school in La Molina District, Lima, Peru. It has scuola infanzia (preschool) through secondaria II grado (upper secondary school).

It was established after two men, Giovanni Raffo and Fortunato Brescia, donated land for a school in 1929. It replaced an Italian school in Callao, Regina Margherita school, first established on June 3, 1872. Raimondi, the namesake of the current school, was one of the founders of the Margherita school. The current Raimondi building opened in 1996.

See also

 Italian Peruvian

References

External links
 Colegio Italiano Antonio Raimondi
  Colegio Italiano Antonio Raimondi
  Colegio Italiano Antonio Raimondi

Private schools in Peru
Italian international schools in South America
International schools in Lima